YWCA is a historic YWCA located in downtown Evansville, Indiana. It was built in 1924, and is a three-story, Tudor Revival style red brick clubhouse on a raised basement.

It was listed on the National Register of Historic Places in 1982.

References

YWCA buildings
Clubhouses on the National Register of Historic Places in Indiana
Tudor Revival architecture in Indiana
Buildings and structures completed in 1924
Buildings and structures in Evansville, Indiana
National Register of Historic Places in Evansville, Indiana
History of women in Indiana